One or the Other (German: Der oder der?) is a 1919 German silent film directed by Fritz Bernhardt and starring Victor Janson and Reinhold Schünzel. Originally made in 1916, it was not released until three years later.

Cast
 Victor Janson
 Siegfried Berisch
 Leonhard Haskel
 Tatjana Irrah
 Reinhold Schünzel
 Alfred Kühne

References

Bibliography
 Bock, Hans-Michael & Bergfelder, Tim. The Concise CineGraph. Encyclopedia of German Cinema. Berghahn Books, 2009.

External links

1919 films
Films of the Weimar Republic
German silent feature films
Films directed by Fritz Bernhardt
German black-and-white films
1910s German films